Karlbergs BK is a Swedish football club originating from Karlberg in Birkastaden, an area in the southwestern part of Vasastan in central Stockholm. As Vasastans has no full sized football pitches, the club relocated to neighbouring Kungsholmen and has the majority of its operations on the island.

Background
Karlbergs Bollklubb were formed on 15 May 1912 at a meeting held in a property at Karlbergsvägen 74 in Vasastan. Almost a century after this historic meeting over a thousand boys and girls from Vasastan,  Lindhagen and Kungsholmen districts wear the club's red and white colours.  The name of the club was later changed to "Widar" before being registered as Karlbergs Bollklubb in 1919.

Since their foundation Karlbergs BK has participated mainly in the middle and lower divisions of the Swedish football league system.  The club currently plays in Division 2 Norra Svealand which is the fourth tier of Swedish football. They play their home matches at Stadshagens IP on Kungsholmen in central Stockholm.

Karlbergs BK are affiliated to Stockholms Fotbollförbund.

The club has also been playing bandy and ice hockey. While the ice hockey department is defunct since its merger with Tranebergs IF, the bandy department is formally just dormant since 2003. Since 2017, the club plays floorball.

Recent history
In recent seasons Karlbergs BK have competed in the following divisions:

2021 – Division II, Norra Svealand
2020 – Division II, Norra Svealand
2019 – Division II, Norra Svealand
2018 – Division II, Norra Svealand
2017 – Division II, Norra Svealand
2016 – Division II, Norra Svealand
2015 – Division III, Östra Svealand
2014 – Division II, Norra Svealand
2013 – Division II, Norra Svealand
2012 – Division II, Norra Svealand
2011 – Division III, Norra Svealand
2010 – Division III, Norra Svealand
2009 – Division III, Norra Svealand
2008 – Division III, Norra Svealand
2007 – Division IV, Stockholm Mellersta
2006 – Division IV, Stockholm Mellersta
2005 – Division IV, Stockholm Mellersta
2003 – Division IV, Stockholm Mellersta
2002 – Division IV, Stockholm Mellersta
2001 – Division IV, Stockholm Mellersta
2000 – Division IV, Stockholm Mellersta
1999 – Division V, Stockholm Mellersta

In 2015, manager Kalle Karlsson brought Karlberg to promotion qualification playoffs in division III and managed to secure promotion to division II for the following year. During 2016, the first season in division II, Kalle Karlsson once again reached promotion qualification playoffs, but narrowly lost in the final phase of the playoffs. Following the 2016 season, Kalle Karlsson left Karlbergs BK to join Vasalunds IF. After a mediocre 2017 season for Karlberg, Kalle Karlsson returned to the club for the 2018 and 2019 seasons, and led Karlberg to promotion qualification playoffs both years, but failed on both occasions to take the final step to division I. Following the 2019 season, Kalle Karlsson left for an assistant coach role at Superettan club Västerås SK, and 24 year old coaching talent Douglas Jakobsen was selected to manage Karlbergs BK for the 2020 season.

Attendances

In recent seasons Karlbergs BK have had the following average attendances:

Footnotes

External links
 Karlbergs BK – Official website
 Karlbergs BK on Facebook

Football clubs in Stockholm
Association football clubs established in 1912
Bandy clubs established in 1912
1912 establishments in Sweden